Henri Esteve (born May 6, 1989) is a Cuban-American actor best known for his role as Javier Salgado on the ABC series Revenge.

Early life and education 
Henri was born and raised in Miami Beach, Fl. He has one sibling, an older brother, artist Franz Klainsek. Henri became interested in acting during his teenage years and at 17 moved to New York City. In New York City he completed a two-year conservatory program at the Lee Strasberg Theatre and Film Institute.

Career 
After graduating, Esteve initially pursued theatre and was cast as Romeo in Romeo and Juliet at La Mama E.T.C.. After this he went on to do multiple plays around the Manhattan. Including Does a Tiger Wear a Necktie, AND Homefront. He later moved to Los Angeles, where he made his Television debut in 2014 on the hit ABC series Revenge, playing Javier Salgado. A friend of Nolan Ross(Gabriel Mann), whom he met in jail after the latter was framed for terrorism. On Release Javier moves into Nolan's house in that Hamptons. He goes on to date Charlotte Grayson (Christa B. Allen), and becomes business partners Daniel Grayson(Josh Bowman).

His next film project was again in 2014 in the independent film Microwave directed and written by Neil Champagne, which he starred alongside AJ Buckley and Doris Roberts.

In 2015, Henri began writing and developing a One Man Show Patsy about the life and death of Lee Harvey Oswald.

Esteve's next film role will be in the feature film Blackout, written and directed by Daniela de Carlo and produced by Aaron Cruze.

In 2018 Henri played Abel in Amazon Series Homecoming. Starring Julia Roberts and Stephan James.

In 2020 Henri joined the cast of the FreeForm series Grown-ish playing Javier. A gorgeous grad student whom Ana (Francia Raisa) interns with at Cal U. A well-educated Cuban Republican activist, Javi is able to cross party lines with his unwavering morals and his James Dean mystique.

Filmography

References

External links 

American people of Cuban descent
21st-century American male actors
Living people
1989 births
American male film actors
American male television actors
Male actors from Miami